Kurt Oppelt (March 18, 1932 – September 16, 2015) was an Austrian figure skater who is best known for his career in pair skating. With Sissy Schwarz, he is the 1956 Olympic champion, the 1956 World champion, the 1956 European champion, and a five-time Austrian national champion (1952–56).

Career

Single skating 
Oppelt started his career as a singles skater, taking bronze at the Austrian Championships in 1951–52 and silver in 1953. He placed 11th both at the 1952 Olympics and at the 1953 World Championships.

Pair skating 
Oppelt's partner in pair skating was Sissy Schwarz. In 1952, they won their first national title and were sent to their first European Championships, where they placed seventh. The pair then competed at the 1952 Winter Olympics in Oslo, Norway, where they placed ninth, and at the 1952 World Championships, finishing seventh.

Schwarz/Oppelt stepped onto the European podium for the first time at the 1953 European Championships, where they won the bronze medal, and then placed sixth at the World Championships. In 1954, they became European silver medalists and went on to win their first World medal, bronze, at the 1954 World Championships. They followed it up with silver at the 1955 World Championships, finishing as close runners-up to Canada's Frances Dafoe / Norris Bowden, who took their second World title.

After winning the Austrian national title for the fifth consecutive year, Schwarz/Oppelt became the 1956 European champions. They then competed at the 1956 Winter Olympics in Cortina d'Ampezzo, Italy. Skating to Banditenstreiche by Franz von Suppé, they won the gold medal ahead of Dafoe/Bowden, who faltered on a lift, causing them to finish after their music ended. The judging panel was split 6 to 3 in favor of Schwarz/Oppelt.

Schwarz/Oppelt went on to win the 1956 World title before retiring from competition. In the summer of 1956, they joined the Wiener Eisrevue and performed in ice shows for three or four years.

Later life 
Oppelt was the coach of the Royal Dutch figure skating team from 1957–60. He later settled in the United States. Beginning in 1967, Oppelt was an instructor at the Pennsylvania State University in its College of Health, Physical Education and Recreation. He was inducted into Austrian Olympic Hall of Fame in 1976. In 1996, he received the Golden Medal of Honor for Services to the Republic of Austria.

With his wife Cathleen, he has two sons, Kurt and Christopher, born in the 1970s.

Results

Pairs with Schwarz

Single skating

See also
List of Pennsylvania State University Olympians

References

External links
Video clip of Schwartz and Oppelt at the 1956 Olympics
Video clip of Schwartz and Oppelt at the 1956 World Championships (rare and only pair recorded)
Video clip Video clip of 1956 World Championships Medal Ceremony.

Navigation

1932 births
2015 deaths
Austrian male pair skaters
Austrian male single skaters
Figure skaters at the 1952 Winter Olympics
Figure skaters at the 1956 Winter Olympics
Olympic figure skaters of Austria
Olympic gold medalists for Austria
Figure skaters from Vienna
Olympic medalists in figure skating
World Figure Skating Championships medalists
European Figure Skating Championships medalists
Medalists at the 1956 Winter Olympics